The White River is a  river in southern Huron County, Michigan.  It is a tributary of Lake Huron.

See also
List of rivers of Michigan

References

Michigan  Streamflow Data from the USGS

Rivers of Michigan
Rivers of Huron County, Michigan
Tributaries of Lake Huron